The Atherton antechinus (Antechinus godmani), also known as Godman's antechinus, is a species of small carnivorous marsupial native to Australia. It is one of the rarest members of its genus, and differs from other antechinuses in its more rufous body colour and small eyes.

Taxonomy

The Atherton antechinus was first described in 1923 by Oldfield Thomas. For many years, it was regarded as a subspecies of the yellow-footed antechinus (A. flavipes). A member of the dasyurid family, the Atherton antechinus is a member of the genus Antechinus, of which it is one of the most restricted members.

Description

The Atherton antechinus is a dull brown colour, and is among the largest of the antechinuses. The species has an almost naked tail.

The Atherton antechinus believed to be mostly nocturnal or crepuscular, and feeds mostly on terrestrial invertebrates. The mating season is July–August, after which all of the males die.

Distribution and habitat

The Atherton antechinus is restricted to a 130 km region of rainforest between Mount Bellenden Ker and Cardwell, in northeastern Queensland. It builds nests in tree hollows or litter of epiphyte.

References

External links
 Photo of Atherton Antechinus

Dasyuromorphs
Mammals of Queensland
Marsupials of Australia
Mammals described in 1923
Taxa named by Oldfield Thomas